Lusine, formerly L'Usine, L'Usine ICL, and Lusine ICL, is the stage name of Jeff McIlwain, an ambient/IDM musician. A native Texan, McIlwain now resides in Seattle. In 1998, he attended California Institute of the Arts to study 20th century electronic music and sound design for music and film. Soon after, he met Shad Scott and put out a self-titled release with Isophlux.

According to Andy Kellman of AllMusic,

"While there might be other producers who are more accomplished at making idyllic downtempo, or placid IDM, or abstract hip-hop, or haunting ambient techno, or blipping/skipping minimal house, few—if any—are capable of covering all of that ground with such sharp consistency on one disc."

Discography

Albums
 L'usine – L'usine (1999; Isophlux)
 Lusine ICL – A Pseudo Steady State (2000; U-Cover)
 Lusine ICL – Coalition 2000 (2001 live; U-Cover)
 Lusine ICL – Iron City (2002; Mad Monkey/Hymen)
 Lusine ICL – Condensed (2003 anthology; Hymen)
 Lusine – Serial Hodgepodge (2004; Ghostly International)
 Lusine – Podgelism (2007; Ghostly International)
 Lusine – Podgelism Select Remixes (12") (2007; Ghostly International)
 Lusine ICL – Language Barrier (2007; Hymen)
 Lusine – A Certain Distance (2009; Ghostly International)
 Lusine – Lucky Numbers: The Ghostly International EPs (2010; Ghostly International)
 Lusine – The Waiting Room (2013; Ghostly International) 
 Lusine – Sensorimotor (2017; Ghostly International)

EPs and singles
 L'usine – Coded (1999; Isophlux)
 Lusine ICL – Freak (2000; Hymen)
 Lusine ICL – Zealectronic Blue (2000 7"; Zealectronic)
 Lusine ICL – Slipthrough (2001; Hymen)
 L'usine – Surface (2001; Isophlux)
 Lusine ICL – Sustain (2002; Delikatessen)
 Lusine ICL – Chao (2002; Mental.Ind.Records)
 Lusine – Push (2003; Ghostly International)
 Lusine – Flat Remixes (2004; Ghostly International)
 Lusine – Inside/Out (2005; Ghostly International)
 Lusine – Emerald (2006; Ghostly International)
 Lusine – Two Dots (2009; Ghostly International)
 Lusine – Twilight (2010; Ghostly International)
 Lusine – Another Tomorrow (2013; Ghostly International)
 Lusine – Arterial (2014; Ghostly International)
 Lusine – Retrace (2019; Ghostly International)

Compilation albums
 Various Artists – Refurbished Robots: KVRX Local Live Vol. 4 (1999; KVRX CD info)

Video
 VICE video premier of "Just A Cloud".
Stereogum video premier of "Not Alone" (feat. Jenn Champion).

 Lusine live on KEXP in Seattle with drummer, Trent Moorman.

See also 
List of ambient music artists

References

External links

Lusine discography at Discogs

MikeyPod Podcast interview

Ambient musicians
Intelligent dance musicians